Monika Mościbrodzka is a Polish astrophysicist who is a professor at Radboud University Nijmegen. She is an expert in general relativistic plasma dynamics and numerical astrophysics. She was part of the Event Horizon Telescope team who contributed to the first direct image of a black hole, supermassive black hole M87*. She was awarded the 2022 Dutch Research Council Athena Prize and the 2023 Royal Astronomical Society Eddington Medal.

Early life and education 
Mościbrodzka earned her doctorate at the Nicolaus Copernicus Astronomical Center of the Polish Academy of Sciences. Afterwards, she moved to the United States, where she was part of the University of Nevada and University of Illinois Urbana-Champaign.

Research and career 

Mościbrodzka has pioneered the development of numerical astrophysics, which can be used in combination with experimental observations to test general relativity. These studies contributed to the first ever direct image of a black hole, specifically, the supermassive black hole at the centre of Messier 87. Mościbrodzka served as coordinator of the Event Horizon Telescope Polarimetric Working Group and performed polarization analysis of the M87 images. In these polarization-resolved images, the lines mark the direction of the oscillations of the electric vector of the electromagnetic waves.

Mościbrodzka also develops models of the accretion flows in the jets of black holes. By simulating the plasma, magnetic field dynamics and radiative transfer, Mościbrodzka can predict the signatures of accreting black holes.

Awards 
 2019 Bloomberg 50
 2022 Dutch Research Council Athena Award 
 2023 Eddington Medal

Selected publications

References 

Living people
Polish astrophysicists
Academic staff of Radboud University Nijmegen
Women astrophysicists
Year of birth missing (living people)
21st-century Polish physicists
21st-century astronomers
21st-century women scientists
University of Nevada, Las Vegas people
University of Illinois Urbana-Champaign alumni